Vitali Trus (born 24 June 1988) is a Belarusian ice hockey player for HK Neman Grodno and the Belarusian national team.

He participated at the 2017 IIHF World Championship.

References

External links

1988 births
Living people
Belarusian ice hockey goaltenders
People from Navapolatsk
Belarusian expatriate ice hockey people
Belarusian expatriate sportspeople in Ukraine
HK Neman Grodno players
HC Shakhtyor Soligorsk players
Sportspeople from Vitebsk Region